Marcel-Raymond Ecological Reserve is an ecological reserve in Quebec, Canada. It was established on May 27, 1987.

References

External links
 Official website from Government of Québec

Protected areas of Montérégie
Nature reserves in Quebec
Protected areas established in 1987
1987 establishments in Quebec
Le Haut-Richelieu Regional County Municipality